The institute came into existence on May 1, 1962 and is located in Pune, India. It is dedicated to conduct research on tribal issues as also to evaluate the various programmes'/schemes' impact on the tribes residing in Maharashtra.

Functions
The primary function of this institute is to conduct research on tribals' issues as also to do studies to gauge the various schemes' impact on Tribal life in the state. It further offers in-serve training courses as also coaching to the tribal aspirants vying for jobs through Maharashtra Public Service Commission's examination among others. It also runs Youth Leadership Training Programmes aimed at tribal groups.

Facilities
Pune Tribal Museum is located in the building of this institute. The institute also has a library with books related to tribals.

References 

Research institutes in Pune
Research institutes established in 1962
1962 establishments in Maharashtra